The Eleventh Hour is a 1912 Australian silent film. It is considered a lost film.

Plot
The script is based on a play "showing the adventures and vicissitudes in the life of a Girl Telegraphist".

The action consisted of four acts:
Act 1 – 'Pangs of Jealousy'
Act 2 – 'Bad Blood'
Act 3 – 'The Distress Call'
Act 4 – 'The Eleventh Hour'

Cast
Cyril Mackay
Sidney Stirling
Leonard Willey
Charles Lawrence
Loris Brown
Irby Marshall

Release
The film was shot in Sydney and released in that city in 1912. It screened in London in September 1913 under the title Saved by Telegram.

The critic from The Sydney Morning Herald said that "the story is a thrilling one, whilst the cinematographic work of Mr. Franklyn Barrett, the West expert, is particularly good."

References

External links

1912 films
Australian drama films
Australian silent films
Australian black-and-white films
Lost Australian films
1912 drama films
1912 lost films
Lost drama films
Films directed by Franklyn Barrett
Silent drama films